Baniajan Union is a union parishad of Dhanbari Upazila, Tangail District, Bangladesh. It is situated 67 km north of Tangail.

Demographics

According to Population Census 2011 performed by Bangladesh Bureau of Statistics, The total population of Baniajan union is 17271. There are 4760 households in total.

Education

The literacy rate of Baniajan Union is 41.2% (Male-43.6%, Female-39%).

See also
 Union Councils of Tangail District

References

Populated places in Dhaka Division
Populated places in Tangail District
Unions of Dhanbari Upazila